Nigavan is a village in the Aparan Municipality of the Aragatsotn Province of Armenia. The town has a cyclopean fort.

References 

Populated places in Aragatsotn Province